Caulastraea is a genus of stony corals in the family Merulinidae. Species of Caulastraea are commonly found in the aquarium trade under the names candy cane coral or trumpet coral.

Species 
The following species are currently recognized:

Caulastraea connata (Ortmann, 1892)
Caulastraea curvata Wijsman-Best, 1972
Caulastraea echinulata (M. Edwards & Haime, 1849)
Caulastraea furcata Dana, 1846
Caulastraea tumida Matthai, 1928

Gallery

References

External links 

Merulinidae
Scleractinia genera